Deh Rud (also Romanized as Deh Rūd; also known as Dow Rūd) is a village in Jaydasht Rural District, in the Central District of Firuzabad County, Fars Province, Iran. At the 2006 census, its population was 138, in 38 families.

References 

Populated places in Firuzabad County